Jean-Paul Rodrigue (born July 20, 1967) is a Canadian scholar of transportation geography. He has a PhD in transport geography from the Université de Montréal (1994) and has been part of the Department of Global Studies and Geography at Hofstra University in Hempstead, New York, since 1999. His work, (The Global Economic Space: Advanced Economies and Globalization) won the PricewaterhouseCoopers "Best Business Book" award in 2000. In 2019, the American Association of Geographers granted Rodrigue the Edward L. Ullman Award for outstanding contribution to the field of transport geography.

In 2008, Rodrigue achieved notability with his model of economic bubbles, charting four phases of a bubble. While the "smart money" has purchased during the earlier "stealth phase", institutional investors begin to buy  during "take off". Following media coverage, the general public begins to invest leading to steep rise in prices as "enthusiasm" and then "greed" kick in. "Delusion" precedes the peak.

The chart was widely syndicated during the 2007–2008 financial crisis.

Publications

References

External links 
 Dr. Jean-Paul Rodrigue on Hofstra University website
The Geography of Transport Systems, online edition.
Port Economics, Management and Policy, online edition.

1967 births
Living people
Canadian geographers
People from Montreal
Transportation planning
Université de Montréal alumni